High-dimensional model representation is a finite expansion for a given multivariable function. The expansion was first described by Ilya M. Sobol as

 

The method, used to determine the right hand side functions, is given in Sobol's paper.  A review can be found here: High Dimensional Model Representation (HDMR): Concepts and Applications.

See also
Variance-based sensitivity analysis
Volterra series

References

Functions and mappings